Marek Jastráb (born 16 July 1993) is a Slovak football midfielder who currently plays for the club SC Zöbern.

Spartak Myjava
He made his Corgoň Liga debut for Spartak Myjava against FC Spartak Trnava on 27 October 2012.

External links
Spartak Myjava profile

References

1993 births
Living people
Slovak footballers
Association football midfielders
Spartak Myjava players
FK Dubnica players
AFC Nové Mesto nad Váhom players
Slovak Super Liga players